Xie Dongmin may refer to:

Hsieh Tung-min (1908–2001), or Xie Dongmin, Taiwanese politician
Tse Tung-man (born 1985), or Xie Dongmin, Hong Kong singer and actor